Waarschoot is a town and former municipality located in the Flemish province of East Flanders, in Belgium. The municipality comprised the towns of Waarschoot proper. In 2018, Waarschoot had a total population of 7,967.

Until 31 December 2018, Waarschoot was one of the few Belgian municipalities having a female mayor. Her name is Ann Coopman.

Effective 1 January 2019, Waarschoot, Lovendegem, and Zomergem were merged into the new municipality of Lievegem, with only one mayor remaining, Tony Vermeire (CD&V).

Gallery

References

External links

  Official website 

Lievegem
Former municipalities of East Flanders
Populated places in East Flanders